María Guadalupe Cruzaley Parra (born 10 December 1986), also known as Guadalupe Cruzaley, is a former Mexican footballer who last played as a defender for Liga MX Femenil club Monarcas Morelia. She has been a member of the Mexico women's national team.

International career
Cruzaley capped for Mexico at senior level in the 2015 International Women's Football Tournament of Natal.

See also 
 List of Mexico women's international footballers

References

External links 
 

1986 births
Living people
Women's association football defenders
Mexican women's footballers
Footballers from Michoacán
Mexican footballers
Mexico women's international footballers
Universiade silver medalists for Mexico
Universiade medalists in football
Liga MX Femenil players
Atlético Morelia players
Medalists at the 2013 Summer Universiade